Djibouti–France relations are the current and historical relationship between Djibouti and France. Djibouti was obtained as a colony by France in 1862. France officially controlled Djibouti until it received independence in 1977. Djibouti maintains military and economic agreements with France, which provide continued security and economic assistance. The largest French military base in Africa is located in Djibouti's territorial waters in the Red Sea.

Resident diplomatic missions 
 Djibouti has an embassy in Paris.
 France has an embassy in Djibouti City.

References

External links
 Djibouti-France relations French Government
 France acquits Djibouti officials BBC News, 29 May 2009
 Treaty of Treaty of Friendship and Cooperation signed 1977
 Djibouti: France's strategic toehold in Africa 1974
 Beyond the banlieues The Economist, May 10, 2007

 
France
Bilateral relations of France
Relations of colonizer and former colony